Novoli is a city quarter in the northwestern part of Florence, Italy. It was part of the former comune of Pellegrino until 1865, when it became a part of the comune of Florence. Notable buildings in Novoli include:
the ruins of Villa San Donato
the new Tribunal of Florence, opened in 2012
the Faculty of Social Sciences of the University of Florence
Santa Maria a Novoli Church
Donato in Polverosa Church

Districts of Florence